Artesia Public Schools (APS) is a school district headquartered in Artesia, New Mexico.

In Eddy County the district includes: Artesia, Atoka, Hope, Loco Hills, and Morningside. The district also has a portion in Chaves County.

History

Crit Caton announced she would retire as superintendent in 2019. John Ross Null became the superintendent at that time.

In October 2020, during the COVID-19 pandemic in New Mexico, the school still had all virtual classes and a suspension of athletic activities. A group of students advocated for in person classes and activities.

Schools
 Secondary
 Artesia High School
 Artesia Junior High School

 Primary
 Artesia Intermediate School
 Elementary schools:
 Central Elementary School
 Hermosa Elementary School
 Peñasco Elementary School (Unincorporated area, Hope postal address)
 Roselawn Elementary School
 Yeso Elementary School
 Yucca Elementary School

 Preschool
 Grand Heights Early Childhood Center

References

External links
 

School districts in New Mexico
Education in Chaves County, New Mexico
Education in Eddy County, New Mexico